Scopely, Inc is an interactive entertainment company and mobile-first video game developer and publisher. The company is headquartered in Culver City, California, with offices across the US, EMEA and Asia.

Scopely has both internal game development studios as well as partners with external development studios to create free-to-play games. Scopely also partners with intellectual property holders to create video games based on popular entertainment brands.

History 
Scopely was founded in 2011 by Walter Driver, Ankur Bulsara, Eric Futoran and Eytan Elbaz. Previously, Elbaz co-founded Applied Semantics, which was acquired by Google in 2003, and Bulsara was a software developer at MySpace. In 2014, former Disney Interactive and Electronic Arts executive Javier Ferreira joined Scopely. Former Disney Interactive executive Tim O'Brien joined in 2014 as chief revenue officer.

In August 2015, Scopely ranked #9 on Inc.'s List of the 5000 Fastest-Growing Companies in America, and #1 in the US.

In October 2017, the company announced it was opening an office in Barcelona.

In May 2019, the company acquired Dublin-based DIGIT game studios, its collaborator on the mobile 4x strategy game Star Trek Fleet Command.

In June 2019, the company shared it had surpassed $1 billion in lifetime revenues.

In January 2020, the company purchased FoxNext Games Los Angeles and its RPG game MARVEL Strike Force, along with Cold Iron Studios, from The Walt Disney Company for an undisclosed amount. Scopely later sold Cold Iron Studios to Daybreak Game Company.

In April 2020, Scopely also acquired PierPlay game studio, its collaborator on the mobile word game Scrabble GO.

In October 2021 Scopely acquired Game Show Network's online gaming division (GSN Games) from Sony in a $1 billion cash and stock deal. Sony Pictures took a minority stake in the company as a result.

Games 

In January 2012, Scopely launched its first free-to-play mobile game Dice with Buddies, followed that year by Jewels with Buddies and Bubble Galaxy with Buddies, which debuted as the #1 free app in the App Store.

In April 2013, Scopely launched Mini Golf MatchUp, a head-to-head game developed with New Zealand-based studio Rocket Jump. The game was #1 for free apps in the App Store in 49 countries and the #1 app on both the iPhone and the iPad in the U.S. In September 2013, Scopely launched Wordly, a spelling game that reached #1 on the top free apps chart in the App Store, and was the first game with single-player mode developed by Scopely. In November 2013, the company launched the Skee-ball game Skee-ball Arcade, which reached #1 overall in the App Store.

In June 2014, Scopely launched Slots Vacation. In July 2014, Scopely acquired Space Inch's Disco Bees. In April 2015, Scopely partnered with Hasbro to launch the only officially licensed Yahtzee game, Yahtzee With Buddies, on iOS, Android and the Apple Watch. The game saw more than 1 million downloads in its first four days. In 2016, Scopely released Dice With Ellen, a Yahtzee-style dice game with Ellen DeGeneres.

In May 2015, Scopely signed a multi-year partnership deal with Ireland's DIGIT games studios. The collaboration led to the acquisition of Kings of the Realm, a fantasy strategy MMO game.

In August 2015, Scopely partnered with The Walking Dead series creator Robert Kirkman and Skybound Entertainment to create The Walking Dead: Road to Survival, the first free-to-play mobile game based on the graphic novels. The game saw 4 million downloads in its first week, was a Top 25 Grossing Game in 17 countries, and became the 6th consecutive #1 game released by Scopely. In 2017, Scopely's The Walking Dead: Road to Survival experienced programming-induced glitches which affected player usage and brought long wait times for matchmaking. Scopely's game developers apologized and offered virtual items as compensation, but some players complained about the value of those gifts. As of 2018, 40 million people have installed the game since its release.

In 2016, the company partnered with Sony Pictures TV to launch Wheel of Fortune: Free Play, based on the television game show.

Scopely announced a partnership with World Wrestling Entertainment in 2017, and launched the match-3 game WWE Champions. It won a Webby Award for People's Voice in the sports games category.

In 2018, Scopely had four top-grossing games: WWE Champions, The Walking Dead: Road to Survival, Wheel of Fortune: Free Play, and Yahtzee With Buddies. In November 2018, Scopely launched Star Trek Fleet Command, partnering with CBS Interactive and DIGIT Game Studios. In December 2018, Scopely launched Looney Tunes World of Mayhem, a multi-player role-playing game featuring Looney Tunes characters licensed from Warner Bros. Interactive Entertainment, developed in partnership with Aquiris Game Studio. The game was downloaded more than one million times on its launch day.

In 2019, the company shared Star Trek Fleet Command surpassed $50 million in revenue in four months.

In 2022, the company acquired the mobile party battle royale game Stumble Guys from Kitka Games.

Funding 
In 2013, Scopely raised a seed round of $8.5 million, led by Anthem Venture Partners, with participation from The Chernin Group, Greycroft Venture Partners, and New Enterprise Associates. In 2014, Scopely raised a $35 million Series A funding round, led by Evolution Media. In 2016, Scopely raised $55 million in Series B funding. In 2017, the company announced $60 million in Series C funding, led by Revolution Growth, and then raised an additional $100 million from Greenspring Associates in 2018.

In 2019, the company announced $200 million in Series D financing, valuing the company at $1.7 billion. In March 2020, the company announced another $200 million in Series D financing, valuing the company at $1.9 billion.

In October 2020, Scopely announced $340 million in Series E financing, valuing the company at $3.3 billion.

As of October 2021, Scopely was valued at $5.4 billion.

References

Further reading

External links 
 

Privately held companies based in California
Video game companies based in California
Video game companies established in 2011
Video game development companies
Video game publishers
Mobile game companies
American companies established in 2011
Companies based in Culver City, California
2011 establishments in California